The first season of the superhero comedy drama television series The Umbrella Academy was released on Netflix on February 15, 2019 and consisted of 10 episodes. Developed by Steve Blackman and developed by Jeremy Slater, the series is an adaptation of the comic book series of the same name written by Gerard Way and illustrated by Gabriel Bá, both of whom serve as executive producers on the series. The first season revolves around the titular Academy (a group of adopted superhero siblings) reuniting after years apart to investigate the mystery of their father’s death and the threat of a looming apocalypse.

The first season features Elliot Page, Tom Hopper, David Castañeda, Emmy Raver-Lampman, Robert Sheehan, Aidan Gallagher, Cameron Britton, Mary J. Blige, John Magaro, Adam Godley, Colm Feore as the main cast, while Sheila McCarthy, Justin H. Min, Jordan Claire Robbins, Kate Walsh, and Ashley Madekwe appear in recurring roles. The first season received positive reviews from critics and audiences alike.

Cast and characters

Main 
 Elliot Page as Vanya Hargreeves / The White Violin / Number Seven
T.J. McGibbon as young Vanya
 Tom Hopper as Luther Hargreeves / Spaceboy / Number One
 Cameron Brodeur as young Luther
 David Castañeda as Diego Hargreeves / The Kraken / Number Two
Blake Talabis as young Diego
 Emmy Raver-Lampman as Allison Hargreeves / The Rumor / Number Three
Eden Cupid as young Allison
 Robert Sheehan as Klaus Hargreeves / The Séance / Number Four
Dante Albidone as young Klaus
 Aidan Gallagher as Five Hargreeves / The Boy / Number Five
 Mary J. Blige as Cha-Cha
 Cameron Britton as Hazel
 John Magaro as Leonard Peabody / Harold Jenkins
 Adam Godley as Pogo
 Colm Feore as Sir Reginald Hargreeves / The Monocle

Recurring 

 Sheila McCarthy as Agnes Rofa
 Justin H. Min as Ben Hargreeves / The Horror / Number Six
 Ethan Hwang as young Ben
 Jordan Claire Robbins as Grace Hargreeves / Mom
 Kate Walsh as The Handler
 Ashley Madekwe as Detective Eudora Patch
 Peter Outerbridge as The Conductor
 Rainbow Sun Francks as Detective Chuck Beaman

Notable guests 
 Ken Hall as Herb
 Patrice Goodman as Dot

Episodes

Production

Development
A film version of the comic book series The Umbrella Academy was optioned by Universal Studios. Originally, screenwriter Mark Bomback was hired to write the screenplay; Rawson Marshall Thurber reportedly replaced him in 2010. There had been little talk of the film from that time. In an interview with Newsarama at the 2012 New York Comic Con, Way mentioned that there have been "good talks" and a "really good script", but that it was "kind of up to the universe".

On July 7, 2015, it was announced that The Umbrella Academy would be developed into a television series, rather than an original film, produced by Universal Cable Productions. On July 11, 2017, it was officially announced that Netflix had greenlit a live-action series adaptation of The Umbrella Academy premiering in 2019, with Way and Bá acting as executive producers. Jeremy Slater wrote the script for the pilot episode, and Steve Blackman serves as showrunner. The first season of The Umbrella Academy was released on Netflix on February 15, 2019.

Casting
On November 9, 2017, Netflix confirmed that Elliot Page had joined the cast and that he would play Vanya Hargreeves, also known as the White Violin. On November 30, 2017, it was revealed that Tom Hopper, David Castañeda, Emmy Raver-Lampman, Robert Sheehan and Aidan Gallagher had joined the cast as the rest of the Hargreeves siblings. On February 12, 2018, Netflix announced that Academy Award nominee Mary J. Blige would appear in the series as the sadistic time-travel assassin Cha-Cha. Colm Feore joined the cast as Sir Reginald Hargreeves, the adoptive father of the siblings, on February 16, 2018, alongside Cameron Britton, Adam Godley and Ashley Madekwe. On February 28, 2018, it was announced that John Magaro has been cast as a series regular character.

Filming
Principal photography for the first season began on January 15, 2018, in Toronto. Gerard Way posted on his Instagram account an illustration by Fabio Moon of the cast and crew doing the first table read of the script in Toronto. He also revealed a picture of the first day on the set. Additional filming took place in Hamilton, Ontario.

For the theatre where Vanya performed with her violin, the crew used the Elgin Theatre, alongside the Winter Garden Theatre. Mazzoleni Concert Hall was used to represent the theatre's exterior. The exterior of the mansion was filmed at a building in Hamilton, while the interiors were filmed in studio. The Joey & Toby Tanenbaum Opera Centre was filmed for an outside scene and LIUNA Station was used for a bank robbery scene. A laboratory at the University of Toronto was filmed to represent the Meritech Prosthetics building. The filming concluded on July 18, 2018.

Visual effects
Visual effects for the series are handled by SpinVFX, Weta Digital, Folks VFX, Soho VFX, Pixomondo, Deluxe VFX, Digital Film Tree, BOT VFX, Studio 8, Exceptional Minds and MARZ

VFX supervisor Everet Burrell confirmed that he used traditional art techniques for early concept art and referenced great actors with iconic faces. Burrell called Weta Digital, who previously worked for the rebooted Planet of the Apes series, to develop the visual effects for the character of Pogo. Ken Hall provided the motion capture for Pogo using a gray suit to later make additions to his captures to create the CGI of the chimpanzee, with Adam Godley making the facial expressions and voice acting of the character.

SpinVFX confirmed that they delivered at least 563 shots for the series. To make the effects of the show, the team required a series of complex effect simulations, creature development, and massive destructions.

For the effects of Number Five jumping through time and space, Burrell wanted to make the effects look organic, and liquidy, representing how much time and the world bends around him when he jumps, and how quick it should be. For these effects, he used more than 30 frames in the first episodes, however with the progress of the series, this reduced to only 10 frames. To that footage, the team iterated on several kinds of spatial jump effects, all the way from heavy distortion to subtler images. The visual effects team started with some R&D tests. At the end, the final effect, called the "jelly vision", was used to make the series, with Burrell expressing: "as if you're pushing your hand through a jelly membrane, just for a few seconds, and then it pops. It's really, really subtle, but you get a little bit of texture, you get a little bit of striations, almost like the universe is bending as he does his spatial jumps."

In an interview with Burrell he confirmed that to develop the sequences where time is frozen, they took several background shots on location before returning to their stage to shoot the dialogue between Five and The Handler in front of a green screen. They called this effect "Three-Strip" in honor of the Technicolor process used in the 1930s.

Music
The show’s score album, composed by Jeff Russo, was released on February 15, 2019, consecutively with the first season’s release.  During an interview he revealed that the crew needed to use a subtle hand with the score and that he wanted the score to be thematic, by not trying to push too much on the weird and too much on the horrific aspect of the show and the story.

Reception

Audience viewership
On April 16, 2019, Netflix announced that the series had been streamed by over 45 million viewers on its service within its first month of release, with people at least having watched  70% percent of one episode of the series. It was the third most popular TV series on Netflix in 2019, falling behind The Witcher and the third season of Stranger Things.

Critical response

On the review aggregator Rotten Tomatoes, 76% of 92 critic reviews are positive for the first season, with an average rating of 7.2/10. Critics' consensus on the website reads, "The Umbrella Academy unfurls an imaginative yarn with furtive emotion and an exceptionally compelling ensemble, but the series' dour sensibility often clashes with its splashy genre trappings." Metacritic, which uses a weighted average, assigned the season a score of 61 out of 100 based on 22 critics, indicating "generally favorable reviews".

Merrill Barr from Forbes praised the series, and wrote, "If you're looking for a pulpy show with lots of action, melodramatic plotting and eccentric characters then The Umbrella Academy is your ticket." Lorraine Ali from Los Angeles Times in a positive review wrote, "The Umbrella Academy stands out among the countless other superhero series splashed across billboards and your viewing queues." Catherine Gee from the Daily Telegraph gave the series a positive response and commented, "If it does return for a second run, it would be nice to see some more genuinely fresh ideas - without the over-reliance on tried, tested and tired tropes from years past." Adam Graham from The Detroit News commented the series is a worthy enrollment, praising the series for its themes about a dysfunctional family and the characters. Kambole Campbell from Little White Lies considered the series as something to enjoy with a plenty of surprises for someone who has not read the comics, and praised the way that the series interpreted the abusive parental childhood relationship and how at the end this affects the children in their adulthood.

Some critics pointed out similarities between The Umbrella Academy, DC Universe's Doom Patrol and Marvel Comics's X-Men series, both positively and negatively.

Some Jewish writers have criticized The Umbrella Academy for its portrayal of the Handler. In particular, her use of a Yiddish idiom and her membership in a secret society that discreetly causes catastrophic events were together perceived as an antisemitic stereotype of Jewish people secretly and malevolently controlling world events. Amanda Bowman, Vice President of the Board of Deputies of British Jews, wrote that "The use of a Yiddish saying by the evil boss of an organisation which controls the world's timeline is clearly an anti-Semitic trope."

Accolades

Notes

References

External links
 

2019 American television seasons